Delovaya Stolitsa (Ukrainian: Ділова столиця; literally: Business Capital) is one of Ukraine's main business newspapers published weekly in Russian. It's also an online media known as DSnews. It contains news and analytics about Ukrainian political life, economy, banks, companies&markets, real estate.
Delovaya Stolitsa is a member of UAPP. It's the first business newspaper of Ukraine, which began to use full-color printing. The newspaper become profitable after 6–9 months after the launch.

See also
 List of newspapers in Ukraine

External links
 Main page of Delovaya Stolitsa 

Lukoil
Publications established in 2001
Russian-language newspapers published in Ukraine
2001 establishments in Ukraine
Weekly newspapers published in Ukraine